Engelbert Lulla (born 25 September 1925) is an Austrian sprint canoer who competed in the early 1950s. He won a gold medal in the C-2 1000 m event at the 1954 ICF Canoe Sprint World Championships in Mâcon. Lulla also finished sixth in the C-2 1000 m event at the 1952 Summer Olympics in Helsinki.

References

External links
 

1925 births
Possibly living people
Austrian male canoeists
Canoeists at the 1952 Summer Olympics
Olympic canoeists of Austria
ICF Canoe Sprint World Championships medalists in Canadian